Nils Pédat (born 12 July 2001) is a Swiss professional footballer who plays as a midfielder for Stade Nyonnais.

Career
Pédat began his senior career with Gland and Stade Nyonnais, before transferring to Servette in 2020. He made his professional debut with Servette in a 5–0 Swiss Super League loss to Basel on 18 April 2021. He signed his first professional contract with Servette on 2 July 2021.

Personal life
Pédat is the son of the retired footballer Eric Pédat.

References

External links
 
 SFL Profile

2001 births
Living people
Swiss men's footballers
Switzerland youth international footballers
Association football midfielders
Servette FC players
FC Stade Nyonnais players
Swiss Promotion League players
2. Liga Interregional players
Swiss Super League players